Lebia maraniana is a species of ground beetles in the Harpalinae subfamily that is endemic to Spain.

References

Lebia
Beetles described in 1943
Endemic fauna of Spain
Beetles of Europe